George Paling (29 November 1836 – 18 December 1879) was an English first-class cricketer active 1865–67 who played for Nottinghamshire. He was born and died in Nottingham.

References

1836 births
1879 deaths
English cricketers
Nottinghamshire cricketers